William Joseph Landergan (August 28, 1899 – April 15, 1970) was an American politician and jurist.

Landergan served as a member of the Massachusetts House of Representatives from 1935–1937 and later served as a judge in the Lynn District Court.

See also
 1935–1936 Massachusetts legislature

References

Democratic Party members of the Massachusetts House of Representatives
Politicians from Lynn, Massachusetts
Bentley University alumni
Boston University School of Law alumni
1899 births
1970 deaths
20th-century American politicians